"A Wonder Like You" is a song written by Jerry Fuller and performed by Rick Nelson.

Chart performance
"A Wonder Like You" reached #11 on the Billboard Hot 100 in 1961.

Other versions
Jerry Fuller recorded a version that was released on the 2003 album, The Lost '60s Recordings.

References

1961 songs
1961 singles
Songs written by Jerry Fuller
Ricky Nelson songs
Imperial Records singles